Pope Gregory XI (r. 1370–1378) created 21 cardinals in two consistories held during his pontificate. Two of the cardinals that he named became antipopes Clement VII and Benedict XIII.

30 May 1371
 Pedro Gómez Barroso
 Jean de Cros
 Bertrand de Cosnac Can. Reg. O.S.A.
 Bertrand Lagier O.F.M.
 Robert de Genève
 Guillaume de Chanac O.S.B.
 Jean Lefèvre
 Jean de la Tour O.S.B. Clun.
 Giacomo Orsini
 Pierre Flandrin
 Guillaume Noellet
 Pierre de Vergne

20 December 1375
 Pierre de la Jugié O.S.B. Clun.
 Simone Brossano
 Hughes de Montrelais
 Jean de Bussière O.Cist.
 Guy de Malsec
 Jean de la Grange O.S.B.
 Pierre de Sortenac
 Gérard du Puy O.S.B. Clun.
 Pedro Martínez de Luna y Pérez de Gotor

Notes and references

Sources

College of Cardinals
Gregory XI
 Greg